Zawitała is a village in the administrative district of Gmina Nowodwór, within Ryki County, Lublin Voivodeship, in eastern Poland.

Historically, it was a part of Stężyca Land in the Sandomierz Voivodeship. In the 16th century it was the property of Mikołaj Kłoczowski, a local land official. In 1827, as a part of Drążgów goods, it had 20 houses and 136 inhabitants. By the end of the 19th century it had 23 houses and 151 inhabitants.

References

Villages in Ryki County